The Frank E. and Emma A. Gillen House is a historic two-and-a-half-story house in Lincoln, Nebraska, United States. It was built in 1903 for Frank Gillen, the founder of the Gillen and Boney Candy Company. His wife Emma was an immigrant from Germany. The house became a designated city landmark in 1983. It has been listed on the National Register of Historic Places since March 5, 1998.

References

		
National Register of Historic Places in Lincoln, Nebraska
Houses completed in 1903